Duval Township is an inactive township in Jasper County, in the U.S. state of Missouri.

Duval Township has the name of the proprietor of an old trading post within the township's borders.

References

Townships in Missouri
Townships in Jasper County, Missouri